Diego Daniel Vera Méndez (born January 5, 1985) is a Uruguayan footballer who plays as a striker for Curicó Unido in           the Chilean Primera División.

Career
Vera was born in Montevideo, and began his career playing with his hometown team Bella Vista. Later he played for several Uruguayan clubs such as Nacional, Defensor Sporting and Liverpool.

In January 2011, he was transferred to Chinese side Nanchang Hengyuan, where he scored 3 goals in 11 Chinese Super League appearances.

On 20 July 2011, he signed a new deal with Colombian side Deportivo Pereira. Unfortunately, his team was relegated to Categoría Primera B causing his return to Liverpool in early 2012.

On 30 June 2012, he signed for Mexican side Queretaro F.C.

On 16 July 2014, he signed for Estudiantes de La Plata.

Career statistics

Honours
Nacional
Liguilla: 2007, 2008

Notes

References

External links

1985 births
Living people
Footballers from Montevideo
Uruguayan footballers
Uruguayan expatriate footballers
Uruguay international footballers
C.A. Bella Vista players
Club Nacional de Football players
Defensor Sporting players
Liverpool F.C. (Montevideo) players
Shanghai Shenxin F.C. players
Deportivo Pereira footballers
Querétaro F.C. footballers
Estudiantes de La Plata footballers
Atlético de Rafaela footballers
Club Atlético Independiente footballers
Club Atlético Colón footballers
Club Atlético Tigre footballers
Curicó Unido footballers
Uruguayan Primera División players
Liga MX players
Argentine Primera División players
Chilean Primera División players
Chinese Super League players
Categoría Primera A players
Expatriate footballers in China
Uruguayan expatriate sportspeople in China
Expatriate footballers in Colombia
Expatriate footballers in Mexico
Expatriate footballers in Argentina
Expatriate footballers in Chile
Association football forwards